The New Center Park is a park that was added to serve as a gathering place and which hosts a summer long series of weekly events held in the New Center area. It includes outdoor movies and concerts, happy hour, summer Jazz, and regular events for families and children. It began as TastFest, then became the annual five-day CityFest food festival that occurs near Independence Day weekend in the New Center district of Detroit, Michigan. It has since become a summer long affair with the advent called "New Center Park" after the park's name.

The events have traditionally been sponsored by Comerica. The main attractions of the event are vendors representing local restaurants and caterers that provide condensed versions of their menus for sale. The festival is supplemented by live music and other performances, as well as merchandise vendors. Locally referred to as simply "New Center Park."

In 2010, the "New Center Park" summer-long series of events replaced CityFest.

See also

New Center, Detroit

References

External links
New Center Park - Official Homepage

Parks in Detroit
Festivals in Detroit